IJT may refer to:

 International Journal of Transgenderism (now the International Journal of Transgender Health)
 Islami Jamiat-e-Talaba, a student organization in Pakistan